The 1914 Massachusetts gubernatorial election took place on November 3, 1914. Democratic Governor David I. Walsh defeated the Republican, Samuel W. McCall, and the Progressive, Joseph Walker, and won reelection with 45.93% of the vote.

Democratic primary

Governor

Candidates
David I. Walsh, incumbent Governor

Results
Governor Walsh was unopposed for re-nomination.

Lt. Governor

Candidates
Edward P. Barry, incumbent Lieutenant Governor

Results

Republican primary

Governor

Candidates
Samuel McCall, United States Representative from Massachusetts's 8th congressional district

Results
McCall was unopposed for the Republican nomination.

Lt. Governor

Candidates
Grafton D. Cushing, Speaker of the Massachusetts House of Representatives
August H. Goetting, nominee for Lieutenant Governor in 1913
Elmer A. Stevens, Treasurer and Receiver-General of Massachusetts

Results

Progressive primary

Governor

Candidates
 Joseph H. Walker, former Speaker of the Massachusetts House of Representatives

Results
Walker was unopposed for the nomination.

Lt. Governor

Candidates
James P. Magenis, delegate to the 1912 Republican National Convention

Results
Magenis was unopposed for the Progressive nomination.

General election

Candidates
Alfred H. Evans, nominee for Governor in 1913 (Prohibition)
Samuel McCall, U.S. Representative from Winchester (Republican)
Arthur Reimer, candidate for President of the United States in 1912 and Governor in 1913 (Socialist Labor)
Samuel C. Roberts (Socialist)
 Joseph H. Walker, former Speaker of the Massachusetts House of Representatives (Progressive)
David I. Walsh, incumbent Governor (Democratic)

Results

See also
 1914 Massachusetts legislature

References

Bibliography

1914 Massachusetts elections
1914
Massachusetts